KGYN (1210 AM) is a radio station licensed to Guymon, Oklahoma, United States. The station serves the southwestern Kansas area, and carries a talk format. The station is currently owned by Steckline Communications. KGYN broadcasts 10,000 watts on a protected signal and can be heard in 7 states during daytime power and most of the western half of the United States during night time power.

The station uses the slogan "The Five State Big talker." 

The station has been received via skywave in Salt Lake City, Utah.

On June 2, 2020, KGYN was granted an FCC construction permit to increase day power to 22,000 watts.

References

External links

GYN
Radio stations established in 1949
Country radio stations in the United States
1949 establishments in Oklahoma